The 2018 Tajik League is the 27th season of Tajik League, Tajikistan's top division of association football. The season began on 10 March 2018.

Teams
On 8 February 2017, the Tajikistan Football Federation announced that the season would involve eight teams, with Khayr Vahdat, Parvoz and Ravshan dropping out of the league, and Panjshir gaining promotion.

Managerial changes

League table

Results 1–14

Results 15–21

Relegation play-offs
The 2018 season ended with a relegation play-off between the 7th-placed Tajik League team, Panjshir and the runners-up of the Tajik First Division, Eskhata, on a two-legged confrontation.

Panjshir won 11–4 on aggregate and therefore both clubs remained in their respective leagues.

Matches

Week 1

Week 2

Week 3

Week 4

Week 5

Week 6

Week 7

Week 8

Week 9

Week 10

Week 11

Week 12

Week 13

Week 14

Week 15

Week 16

Week 17

Week 18

Week 19

Week 20

Week 21

Season statistics

Scoring
 First goal of the season: Sheriddin Boboev for Istiklol against Khatlon (10 March 2017)

Top scorers

Hat-tricks

References

External links
Football federation of Tajikistan

Tajikistan Higher League seasons
1
Tajik